Verità supposte (translatable as "Presumed Truths", with a subtle pun about "Supposta" also meaning Suppository) is the second studio album by the Italian rapper Caparezza, released on June 13, 2003.

Track listing 
 "Il secondo secondo me" -  4:14
 "Nessuna razza" - 4:09
 "La legge dell'ortica" -  3:50
 "Stango e sbronzo" -  3:45
 "Limiti" -  4:37
 "Vengo dalla Luna" - 4:13
 "Dagli all'untore" - 3:55
 "Fuori dal tunnel" - 3:41
 "Giuda me" - 3:28
 "Nel Paese dei balordi" - 3:51
 "L'età dei figuranti" - 3:49
 "Follie preferenziali" - 4:10
 "Dualismi" - 3:47
 "Jodellavitanonhocapitouncazzo" - 4:05

Certifications

References

2003 albums
Caparezza albums